Jewell Stovall, better known as Babe Stovall (October 14, 1907 – September 21, 1974), was an American Delta blues singer and guitarist.

Stovall was born in Tylertown, Mississippi, United States, in 1907, the youngest of eleven children (thus his nickname "Babe"). He learned to play the guitar by the age of eight, and his guitar playing style was influenced by Tommy Johnson, whom he had met in Mississippi around 1930. In 1964, he  relocated to New Orleans, Louisiana, where he entertained on the streets, and in cafes and galleries of the French Quarter. Stovall frequently took young white musicians under his wing as apprentice performers, teaching them traditional country blues songs and guitar techniques. He variously played his guitar at the back of his neck, and hollered his song lyrics loudly for all in the vicinity to hear. In 1964 he recorded an album for Verve, titled Babe Stovall (which was re-released in 1990 on CD), and undertook more recordings in 1966, released as The Babe Stovall Story.  His later work with Bob West resulted in The Old Ace: Mississippi Blues & Religious Songs, which was released on Arcola (2003). He was credited by some as the character inspiration behind Jerry Jeff Walker's, "Mr. Bojangles".

Stovall played on the college circuit, in addition to being the regular musician at the Dream Palace Bar on Frenchman Street, and The Quarum club in New Orleans.

His death in 1974 was by natural causes.

References

External links
 Illustrated Babe Stovall discography
 Babe Stovall Blues in G from the UCLA Digital Library

1907 births
1974 deaths
Country blues musicians
American blues guitarists
American male guitarists
American blues singers
Songwriters from Mississippi
Musicians from New Orleans
20th-century American singers
20th-century American guitarists
Songwriters from Louisiana
Singers from Louisiana
Guitarists from Louisiana
Guitarists from Mississippi
People from Tylertown, Mississippi
20th-century American male singers
American male songwriters